is a privately-held Japanese manufacturing company of stationery products. The name is a combination of the English words pen and tell (as in, telling a story). Pentel is also the inventor of non-permanent marker technology. Most Pentel products are manufactured in Japan, Taiwan, Korea, Mexico, and France. 

The company is regarded as the inventor of the fibre-tipped (felt-tip) pen in 1963. Nowadays, Pentel produces a wide range of products that include writing implements, art materials and office goods.

History 
The company was founded in 1946 as "Japan Stationery Limited" in Tokyo by Yokio Horie, with the purpose of manufacturing crayons and pastels. The first products for sale were released in 1951, followed by pencils in 1960.

In 1963 Pentel launched the "Sign Pen", a fibre-type pen that was used by then President of the United States Lyndon B. Johnson, who bought a dozen of them to sign photographs, apart from being adopted as the official writing instrument of NASA and going into space with a Gemini mission in 1966. Demand for a Sign Pen was so extraordinary that the Tokyo factories could not supply all requests. The Sign Pen was one of Pentel's most successful products with more than two billion units sold.

In 1971 the company changed its name to "Pentel Co. Ltd." and one year later, the green rollerball pen with water-based ink, was launched. Horie remained as President of the company until his death in 2010.

In the 2010s, Pentel launched the "Pocket Brush", a fudepen that used replaceable waterproof ink cartridges, like fountain pens (and unlike conventional brush pens, which are more like marker pens.)

Brush pens (designed and recommended for calligraphy) have also gained popularity among comic book artists, who choose them to ink their works instead of dip pens or traditional brushes. One of those artists using Pentel was Neal Adams.

Products

Stationery
Product lines include Sharp Kerry, Sharp P200 series, Graph 1000, Graphgear (500, 800 and 1000), Graphlet, Sharplet, Smash, Stein, Orenz, OrenzNero  (mechanical pencils or "sharps"); Ain and Hi-Polymer (mechanical pencil leads, erasers); Energel (gel ink pens); Vicuna (hybrid ink ballpoint pen); Pentel Pen (permanent marker), and Sign Pen (fine tip marker).

Range of products manufactured by Pentel includes:

Other products
Pentel produces and sells electronic devices and production equipment in addition to stationery.

 Electronic equipment – Touch panel, digitizer (liquid crystal pen tablet), touch switch, electronic pen (airpen)
 Production equipment – for industrial robots, industrial automatic assembly machines, precision dies for injection molding, precision hand presses
 OEM supply (OEM Division) – Cosmetic parts, stationery, office supplies, medical equipment

References

External links

 
 Pentel global

Manufacturing companies established in 1946
Manufacturing companies based in Tokyo
Japanese stationery
Japanese brands
Art materials brands
Pen manufacturers
Office supply companies of Japan
Midori-kai
Japanese companies established in 1946